John Edward Ruberto [Sonny] (January 2, 1946 – March 25, 2014) was a backup catcher and pinch runner in Major League Baseball who played over parts of two seasons for the San Diego Padres (1969) and the Cincinnati Reds (1972). Listed at 5' 11", 175 lb., he batted and threw right handed.
 
Besides, Ruberto worked as a Minor league manager and coach in the St. Louis Cardinals organization.

Ruberto died at a hospice center in Florida of cancer at age 68 on March 25, 2014.

See also
 List of St. Louis Cardinals coaches

References

External links

Retrosheet
Obituary

1946 births
2014 deaths
Arkansas Travelers players
Asheville Tourists players
Baseball players from New York (state)
Cincinnati Reds players
Deaths from cancer in Florida
Indianapolis Indians players
Lodi Padres players
Major League Baseball catchers
Minor league baseball managers
Modesto Reds players
People from Staten Island
Raleigh Cardinals players
Rock Hill Cardinals players
St. Louis Cardinals coaches
St. Petersburg Cardinals players
San Diego Padres players
Sarasota Cardinals players
Tulsa Oilers (baseball) players
Winnipeg Goldeyes players
Curtis High School alumni